Ganger were an alternative rock/post rock band from Glasgow, Scotland, with members who also played with Bis, Aereogramme, and Fukuyama.

History
The band was formed in early 1995 by bass guitarists Graham Gavin and Stuart Henderson, along with drummer James A. Young, guitarist Lucy McKenzie, and Steven Clark (aka Sci-Fi Steven) of Bis on drums and keyboards. The band showed obvious influences from Krautrock bands such as Faust, Neu!, and Ash Ra Tempel, and their debut EP Half Nelson was released in 1996 on Glasgow label Vesuvius. Two further EPs followed that year, The Cat's in the Bag...the Bag's in the River, and the Domino Records 'Series 500' release Hollywood Loaf. Continuing on Domino, and now with Martin Allen replacing Clark and Caroline Kraabel added on saxophone, the band's debut album, Fore, was issued in 1997, collecting tracks from the early singles. Henderson and Young then recruited a new line-up of Craig B (guitar, vocals) and Natasha Noramly (bass, formerly of Fukuyama), and released two more singles before second album Hammock Style in 1998, which saw comparisons with Tortoise and Slint, and was followed by a US tour with Mogwai. Craig B left to form Aereogramme, and after the band's third album, Canopy, was recorded, the band split up.

Discography

Singles, EPs
Half Nelson EP (1996) Vesuvius Records
The Cat's in the Bag...the Bag's in the River EP (1996) Planet
Hollywood Loaf EP (1996) Domino Series 500
"Trilogy - D" (1998) Soul Static Sound
"Trilogy - The Underdog" (1998) Soul Static Sound
"Trilogy - Two Lone Swordsmen" (1998) Soul Static Sound
"Geocities" (1998) Domino
With Tongue Twisting Words EP (1998) Domino

Albums
Fore (1997) Domino
Hammock Style (1998) Domino
Canopy (1999) Guided Missile

References

External links
Official website

Scottish rock music groups
Musical groups established in 1995
Musical groups disestablished in 1999
Merge Records artists